Pilot Grove can refer to some places in the United States:

 Pilot Grove, Iowa
 Pilot Grove (historic site), listed on the National Register of Historic Places in Iowa County, Iowa
 Pilot Grove, Missouri
 Pilot Grove Township, Minnesota
 Pilot Grove, Minnesota
 Pilot Grove, Texas